Chat Qayah may refer to:
 Chat Qayah, Ardabil
 Chat Qayah, East Azerbaijan